Albert Edward Betts (8 February 1888 – 20 February 1924) was a British gymnast who competed in the 1912 Summer Olympics and in the 1920 Summer Olympics. He was born in Birmingham, West Midlands,and was the fifth child and fourth son of John Betts (1854-1912) and Ellen (née Pountney) (1855-1944).

He was part of the British team, which won the bronze medal in the gymnastics men's team, European system event in 1912. As a member of the British team in 1920 he finished fifth in the  team, European system competition.

References

External links
Albert Betts' profile at databaseOlympics 
Albert Betts' profile at Sports Reference.com

1888 births
1924 deaths
Sportspeople from Birmingham, West Midlands
British male artistic gymnasts
Gymnasts at the 1912 Summer Olympics
Gymnasts at the 1920 Summer Olympics
Olympic gymnasts of Great Britain
Olympic bronze medallists for Great Britain
Olympic medalists in gymnastics
Medalists at the 1912 Summer Olympics